Jochem Pieter de Gruijter (born 18 April 1978 in Leidschendam, South Holland) is a male volleyball player from the Netherlands, who was a member of the Dutch national men's team that won the gold medal at the 1997 European Championships on home soil (Eindhoven and Den Bosch).

De Gruijter made his international debut for the Netherlands in 1995 against Italy. He obtained a total number of 120 caps for the national team. Later on he started a career in beach volleyball, partnering Gijs Ronnes.

References

See also 
Beach Volleyball Database

1978 births
Living people
Dutch men's volleyball players
Dutch men's beach volleyball players
People from Leidschendam
Sportspeople from South Holland
20th-century Dutch people
21st-century Dutch people